Chimney Rock is a  summit in Capitol Reef National Park in Wayne County, Utah, United States. Precipitation runoff from this feature ends up in the Colorado River drainage basin. The Chimney Rock Trail is a 3.5-mile loop trail that takes hikers to a view of Chimney Rock from above Mummy Cliffs.

Geology
This feature is an erosional remnant composed of red sandstone of the Moenkopi Formation, topped with a Shinarump Conglomerate caprock of the Chinle Formation. The Moenkopi Formation dates to about 245 million years ago, having formed during the Triassic. Long after the sedimentary rocks were deposited, the Colorado Plateau was uplifted relatively evenly, keeping the layers roughly horizontal, but Capitol Reef is an exception because of the Waterpocket Fold, a classic monocline, which formed between 50 and 70 million years ago during the Laramide Orogeny.

Gallery

Climate
Spring and fall are the most favorable seasons to visit Chimney Rock. According to the Köppen climate classification system, it is located in a Cold semi-arid climate zone, which is defined by the coldest month having an average mean temperature below 32 °F (0 °C), and at least 50% of the total annual precipitation being received during the spring and summer.

See also

 Colorado Plateau
 Geology of the Capitol Reef area

References

External links

 Capitol Reef National Park National Park Service
 Chimney Rock Trail:  National Park Service 
 Chimney Rock: Weather forecast

Mountains of Utah
Capitol Reef National Park
Mountains of Wayne County, Utah
Sandstone formations of the United States